

Offseason
May 2 The Huskies named Jocelyn Zabrick, a junior player, as the team captain for the season. Brittany Toor and forward Alex Nelson were appointed alternate captains.

Regular season

Standings

Awards and honors
Julie Friend, WCHA Rookie of the Week (Week of December 14, 2011)
Julie Friend, WCHA Defensive Player of the Week (Week of January 17, 2012)

References

St. Cloud State Huskies
St. Cloud State Huskies women's ice hockey seasons
2011 in sports in Minnesota
2012 in sports in Minnesota